The Marylebone Cricket Club (MCC) toured Australia during the 1970–71 cricket season, playing seven Test matches (as England) and what would become officially recognized as the first-ever One Day International (ODI). This was the MCC's 15th visit to Australia since it took official control of English cricket tours overseas in 1903–1904. The MCC was captained by Ray Illingworth, while Australia was captained by Bill Lawry until he was sacked and replaced by Ian Chappell for the seventh Test.

To date, the England team of 1970-71 remains the only one to have won an Ashes series in Australia without losing any Tests, and only the second team after the Bodyline team to win back the Ashes on Australian soil. 

In addition to the seven Tests and inaugural ODI, the MCC played eight first-class matches (winning one, losing one and drawing the rest), ten one-day matches (winning seven) and a three-day match against a country XI from New South Wales. Following its successful regaining of the Ashes, the MCC also played a Test series in New Zealand before returning home.

Travelling to Australia
The MCC squad flew from London on 18 October 1970. Speaking to the press before departure, captain Ray Illingworth was adamant that his team could win back the Ashes.
I sincerely believe we can win the series and bring back the Ashes. We have a strong side with outstanding fast bowlers and it is generally well balanced. There is no reason why the Ashes should not be back in England next year. 
The initial squad included the following staff and players. Counties in parentheses indicate where a player was currently based at the time.

 David Clark (manager)
 Ray Illingworth (captain) (Leicestershire)
 Colin Cowdrey (vice-captain) (Kent)
 Geoffrey Boycott (Yorkshire)
 Basil D'Oliveira (Worcestershire)
 John Edrich (Surrey)
 Keith Fletcher (Essex)
 John Hampshire (Yorkshire)
 Alan Knott (wicket-keeper) (Kent)
 Peter Lever (Lancashire)
 Brian Luckhurst (Kent)
 Ken Shuttleworth (Lancashire)
 John Snow (Sussex)
 Bob Taylor (wicket-keeper) (Derbyshire)
 Derek Underwood (Kent)
 Alan Ward (Derbyshire)
 Don Wilson (Yorkshire)
 Bernard Thomas (assistant to manager and physiotherapist)

Significance
The 1970-71 series was historically significant in a number of ways:
 It would be the first time since 1920 that an MCC tour to Australia had started in South Australia and not Western Australia. 
 The series would be the first to be scheduled for six Tests instead of five, it would be the first time the MCC would spend Christmas in Tasmania and, after being established in the 1890s, the WACA Ground in Perth would finally host its first Test match. 
 Illingworth's team would also become the first to play on Sundays (which had traditionally been designated as rest days) in most Australian state capitals. As a consequence, rest days were removed from the four-day first-class tour matches and the Test match rest days shifted to Monday.  
 Just as it had hosted the first Test match back in 1877, the Melbourne Cricket Ground would also host what eventually became recognized as the first One-Day International (ODI), which had been hastily arranged after the Third Test was abandoned due to rain and wet conditions preventing play from starting after the first two scheduled days. 

It was also during this series that a number of Australian players made their Test debuts, most notably Rod Marsh, Greg Chappell and Dennis Lillee. All three would retire from Test cricket 14 years later holding a number of Australian - and world - Test cricket records.

Ashes Test matches

First Test

This was the ninth Test match between Australia and England hosted at the Brisbane Cricket Ground. England had not won at the venue since 1936, and the previous two meetings had resulted in draws; prior to those, Australia had won the last four encounters.

Bill Lawry won the toss and batted first and indeed, after a few signs of life in the pitch early, it settled down and became, in the words of Sydney Morning Herald's cricket correspondent Phil Wilkins, "a batsman's treasure trove". Indeed, the only batsman on day one who failed to take advantage of the conditions was Lawry, whose 24-minute stay for four runs ended when he was caught behind gloving an attempted hook shot off John Snow. It would turn out to be one of few moments of joy that day for the tourists. Ian Chappell was next in and combined with Keith Stackpole to add 151 to Australia's total, but not before Stackpole was the beneficiary of some luck. First, he survived what photographic evidence displayed the following day in The Times suggested should have been a run-out, but umpire Lou Rowan ruled that Stackpole had successfully made his ground. Australia's score at the time was 1 for 32. Then he was dropped twice; by John Edrich on 42 and Geoffrey Boycott on 51.

Second Test

Prior to the momentous occasion of the WACA Ground hosting its first Test, England had been playing as the MCC against Western Australia since at least 1907. For the Australians, Greg Chappell would make his Test debut, joining his older brother in the team, at the expense of fellow South Australian Terry Jenner, while England handed the 30-year-old Lancashire paceman Peter Lever his first cap, replacing Derek Underwood.

Third Test

This marked the third time in Test cricket history that a match had been declared abandoned without a ball being bowled.

Fourth Test

After two draws and an abandoned Test, it was England who drew first blood in the series.

Fifth Test

Sixth Test

Seventh Test

One Day Internationals

Only ODI

Other Tour matches

South Australia Country vs MCC

The MCC played a one-day warm up match against an up-country South Australian team. W. G. Grace had played here in 1873–74 on an open space covered with stones, but 97 years later the wicket was 'hard, well-prepared and exceptionally good'. It was not a limited overs match, each side played one innings and could declare. Peter Lever, Alan Ward, Brian Luckhurst, Don Wilson and John Hampshire dropped six easy catches between them before Hutchinson sportingly declared on 146/9. The openers Geoff Boycott and Brian Luckhurst had no problems making the runs, and as they won before the day was out it was agreed that they could continue batting in order to practice.

South Australia vs MCC

Springbok genius Barry Richards, batting like a sleek and shining race car for 224 runs in 378 minutes and 21 fours and a six, make all the English batsmen except Boycott resemble Council rollers.
Richard Whitington

The first First Class Cricket match of the tour was a tougher proposition, but Geoff Boycott added 162 for the first wicket with John Edrich (63) and 138 for the third wicket with Keith Fletcher. At the end of the day Boycott was 173 not out and Fletcher 67 not out, but he was out first thing in the morning, soon followed by Fletcher (71).

Illingworth declared on 451/9, but saw the brilliant South African opener Barry Richards make 224 as South Australia rattled up 649/9. This was Richard's highest first class score, and his maiden first class hundred in Australia, though he would make 356 against Western Australia later in the season. He added 235 for the second wicket with Ian Chappell (93) and 148 for the third wicket with Greg Chappell (57). The tailenders Ashley Mallett, Ken McCarthy and Terry Jenner each scored 28 and the England bowlers suffered, Ray Illingworth's 2/117 being the best analysis. John Snow, who took 2/166, was no-balled 15 times by umpire Ron Joseph. Starting their second innings 198 runs behind the MCC lost three wickets for 51, but Basil d'Oliveira (103 not out) and Keith Fletcher (80) saved the match by adding 183 for the fourth wicket, finishing on 235/4.

Victoria Country vs MCC

The MCC won another upcountry game with Peter Lever taking 4/30 to dismiss the home side for 152, but the runs were harder to come by. John Edrich (57) and Brian Luckhurst added 68 for the first wicket, but Colin Cowdrey was out for a duck. John Hampshire (61) saw them past the winning post and again the MCC continued their batting practice, Bob Taylor (25 not out) and Keith Fletcher (21 not out) carrying on after Hampshire's dismissal.

Victoria vs MCC

The tourists came down with a bump when they met another first class team, in what was billed as a Mini-Test. Bill Lawry won the toss, put the MCC in to bat and must have been satisfied to see them out for 142 on the first day. The Test hopeful Alan Thomson took 6/80 and only John Edrich (44) offered any resistance. Lawry was bowled for a duck by John Snow, but Ian Redpath (68) and Paul Sheahan (71) added 89 for the third wicket before Sheadon ran out his partner and then himself. All the other batsmen got into double figures and Victoria declared for 304/8 at the end of the second day. Geoff Boycott and Brian Luckhurst both made 40 as they put on 79 for the first wicket, and Edrich 42. Colin Cowdrey made a slow 101 (he was likened to a beached whale), his only century of the tour. They reached 327/5, but the Victorian all-rounder Alan Sieler took his best first class haul of 4/18 with his slow left arm bowling and the MCC collapsed to 341 all out. Needing 180 to win Victoria had an easy time of it as Lawry (38) and Redpath (57) added 77 for the first wicket before Ray Illingworth had them both out. Alan Ward took 2/25 and Victoria lost two late wickets, but Paul Sheahan's 57 not out saw them home by 6 wickets. The Prime Minister of Australia Sir Robert Menzies and Premier of Victoria Sir Henry Bolte watched the match and Richard Whitington noted "The Ashes have never looked safer". Ray Illingworth commented "It is better to start at the bottom and work up from there".

New South Wales vs MCC

Faced with another state side the MCC were again in trouble, this time under Colin Cowdrey's captaincy. John Snow was rested after damaging his toes in Melbourne and a stiff and sore Alan Ward strained a calf muscle during the game. In a rain affected match the New South Wales captain and wicket-keeper Brian Taber won the toss and decided to bat. They were 82/3 when Doug Walters came in and made 201 not out, adding 132 with Geoff Davies (57) and 145 with Kerry O'Keeffe (55 not out) before Taber declared at 410/5. Geoff Boycott (36) and Brian Luckhurst (42) added 54 for the first wicket and the MCC passed 100 with one wicket down. The leg-spinner O'Keeffe showed his all-round skills by taking 6/69 and they collapsed to 204 all out and were forced to follow on 206 runs behind. This kind of situation that brought out the best in Geoff Boycott (129 not out) and he added 228 for the first wicket with Brian Luckhurst (135) and 97 for the second with Keith Fletcher (51 not out) to ensure a draw.

Queensland Country vs MCC

Colin Cowdrey led the MCC again in this match and his bowlers John Snow (3/23), Ken Shuttleworth (3/11) and Peter Lever (3/11) soon had the Country XI out for 89. This paltry score was passed with two wickets down and England received 35 8-ball overs of batting practice, making 300 runs in 145 minutes thanks to Basil d'Oliveira (103) and Colin Cowdrey (53). The game ended in near darkness as a thunderstorm came over the mountains, with d'Oliveira's 9 fours and 7 sixes illuminated by lightning.

Queensland vs MCC

Ray Illingworth was back in charge in another rain affected state match. He won the toss and put Queensland in to bat, but Captain Sam Trimble made 177 in 539 minutes, adding 177 for the second wicket with the Indian batsman Rusi Surti (83). When threatened with dismissal by Lord Mayor Clem Jones for slow scoring Trimble showed him a telegram from the Chairman of Selectors Don Bradman saying "Grind them into the ground". No other batsman exceeded 31 and the wickets were spread around as Queensland were finally dismissed on the third day, the first time the MCC dismissed a first class team on the tour. The superbly in form Boycott added 42 for the first wicket with Brian Luckhurst (22) and 180 for the second with John Edrich (120) before he "retired hurt" for 124 at 222/1 to allow other players to bat. Aware of his devotion to batting a journalist joked that Boycott had been hurt in a dressing-room scuffle when he was prevented from continuing his innings, which was met with angry denials from Clark and Illingworth when it was taken up by other papers. Edrich and Fletcher (77) took the score to 284/2 and Basil d'Oliveira (33) and Illingworth (40 not out) batted out the fourth day as the game ended in an inevitable draw.

Queensland Country vs MCC

The MCC not unexpectedly won another game against a Queensland Country XI in their last match before the First Test at Brisbane. The home team managed to add 58 for the first wicket, thanks to Alan Brown's 44, but they fell to Ray Illingworth's off-spin (4/30) and, more surprisingly, Colin Cowdrey's part-time leg-spin (3/18). Cowdrey opened the batting with John Hampshire, but the MCC collapsed to 68/3. Illingworth (52 not out) and Brian Luckhurst (37 not out) saw them to victory and continued batting in an unbeaten stand of 87.

Western Australia vs MCC

What spinners? Didn't know they had brought any with 'em. Underwood, Wilson and Illingworth can't turn the ball in normal English conditions, so what hope have they got out here? Taking wickets in Australia is hard work, I can't see these three having any success.
Tony Lock
After the First Test the MCC flew 2,247 miles (3,617 km) across the Australian continent to play Western Australia in Perth. Bob Willis joined the team after the injured Alan Ward had been sent home. Western Australia were captained by the tough former England spinner Tony Lock who had joined the state when he was dropped by Surrey and England in 1963 for his outspoken views. He won the toss and batted; Ken McAullay retired hurt at 30/0, but returned at the end of the day to take his score to 30. Most of the runs came from the Test batsmen John Inverarity (93) and the future Test batsman Ross Edwards (56) and Lock declared next morning when they were out. The by now established opening partnership of Geoffrey Boycott (126) and Brian Luckhurst (111) took the innings to 215 before a wicket was lost and Ray Illingworth declared just before stumps at 258/3. The England spinners Ray Illingworth (2/85), Keith Fletcher (3/43) and Colin Cowdrey (2/46) worked their way through the second innings and Bob Taylor took two catches and made two stumpings. Only Tony Mann, who made his maiden first class century of 110, and Les Varis, who also made his highest first class score of 44, made runs. "Lockie" came in last and hit 24 not out in a stand of 37 and Western Australia were dismissed for 285. The tourists needed 344 to win a first class match for the first time on the tour, but the makeshift opener Cowdrey was caught by Invererity off Dennis Lillee (2/72) for 6 and the MCC were 12/1. John Edrich (70) and Keith Fletcher (45) added 108 for the second wicket, but they lost regular wickets thereafter and only 60 not out by Brian Luckhurst, coming in at number 6, kept the team together and they survived with 256/6.

Western Australia Country vs MCC

The MCC won another country match, but it was not the push over that the other had been. No England bowler took a wicket in the home team's 150/2 as both openers were run out before a sporting declaration was made. Alan Knott (32) and Keith Fletcher (66) opened the innings and put on 86, but they lost five wickets before they hit the winning runs. As before they batted on to the end of the day for batting practice and ended on 163/5.

South Australia vs MCC

Thus did D'Oliveira save the M.C.C. from a second defeat. What a tragedy he was not permitted to bat in this fashion, to bat true to type and inclination, to help force an English victory when the opportunity presented itself in the Brisbane Test. For, on this Adelaide occasion, D'Oliveira was magnificent. He batted with authority and power to strike 22 boundaries during his 232 minutes at the crease. This was the D'Oliveira Australians had heard about, the D'Oliveira they wanted to see, the D'Oliveira who had escaped the confines of Coloured cricket in Cape Town to win the hearts of the world.
Richard Whitington
After having had the better of another draw in the Second Test the MCC returned to play their second game against Ian Chappell's powerful South Australian team. Colin Cowdrey was captain and Alan Knott was included as a batsman while the reserve wicket-keeper Bob Taylor took over behind the stumps. Ian Chappell won the toss and elected to bat and Barry Richards (146) and Ashley Woodcock took the score to 250/0 before Woodcock retired hurt and Chappell declared on 297/2 at the end of the first day. Cowdrey (57) opened the batting with Geoff Boycott, who retired hurt for 9 when the score was 23/0. Greg Chappell took 3/41 (and four catches), then Ashley Mallett 4/59 and Terry Jenner (2/72) span their way through the English batsmen. Knott made 42 and Boycott returned at 164/7 and made a typically rearguard 42 not out as the team struggled to 238. South Australia batted again and Ken Shuttleworth bowled Richards for 23, before Greg Chappell (102) showed his style and helped by Ken Cunningham (60) and Ashley Woodcock (52) took the score to 278/4. Bob Willis took 4/81, 3 of them caught by Bob Taylor, to reduce them to 287/7, but Ashley Mallett hit 42 not out and allowed Ian Chappell to declare again at 338/7 to set the MCC 398 to win just before stumps on the third day. Jeff Hammond (3/61) dismissed Colin Cowdrey, nightwatchman Peter Lever and Keith Fletcher for 29/3, but Geoff Boycott (92) entrenched himself at one end, adding 62 with fellow Yorkshireman John Hampshire (13) before both were out for 135/4. Basil d'Oliveira rescued the innings with a stylish 162 not out despite Mallett's 3/61 and with Derek Underwood (13 not out) made an unbeaten ninth wicket stand of 116. They ended the day on 338/8, 59 runs short of victory and two wickets shy of defeat, but not before Greg Chappell took another 3 catches to give him 7 in the match.

Tasmania vs MCC

Tasmania would not play in the Sheffield Shield until 1976–77 and were much weaker than the other states. Ray Illingworth won the toss and elected to open with Colin Cowdrey (31) and John Edrich (52), who added 84 before both being caught and bowled by slow left arm bowler Brian Patterson. John Hampshire had been Tasmania's coach for two years and made a stylish 156 not out on what was effectively his home ground. He dominated his partnerships of 136 with Bob Taylor (31) and 69 with Basil d'Oliveira (18 not out) until Illingworth declared on 316/4 to let John Snow and Peter Lever bowl before stumps. The Tasmanian captain, Billy Ibadulla (Warwickshire and Pakistan) made only 13 of the 51 run opening stand with Peter Roberts, who struck 77 on his first class debut. Brian Patterson added 31, but the remainder of the team collapsed to Lever (4/17), Don Wilson (3/32) and Derek Underwood (2/17) and were out for 164. Forced to follow on Tasmania had another good start as Ibadulla (51) and Roberts (31) made 58, but Underwood (3/39) and Illingworth (2/24) worked their way through the rest and they were out for 223. The MCC easily made 72/1 to win their first first class match of the tour (in their ninth match), John Edrich top scoring with 42 not out.

Tasmanian Combined XI vs MCC

On tours of Australia it was usual for state teams to be reinforced with potential Australian players to provide stronger opposition, allow the selectors to judge their ability and to entertain the crowd. Paul Sheahan of Victorian was brought over after his failures in the first two Tests, but he did not get to bat as the second and third days of the three-day game were rained off. On the first day Geoff Boycott (74) and Colin Cowdrey (64) added 98 for the first wicket and the tourists reached 184/4 from 47 overs. Manager David Clark told his team that if they continued to play as they did they would be out of a job in fives years and 'pointed the slow-scoring bone at both captains' Ray Illingworth and Bill Lawry. Frank Tyson agreed, writing "Wake up and entertain, or you could be drawing unemployment benefits next week".

New South Wales Country vs MCC

The MCC went into the bush to Wagga Wagga to play a New South Wales Country XI. Ken Shuttleworth opened the bowling with a wicket maiden over, but was then taken off so that others could have some practice, Derek Underwood taking 2/15 and captain Colin Cowdrey 2/9 before they were all out for 117. Geoff Boycott (76) and Brian Luckhurst (62) polished their opening skills with another century stand which fell at 115, three runs short of victory. As before the MCC continued to bat after their victory and both openers were stumped off the bowling of Dasey. Cowdrey (37 not out) added 66 with Alan Knott (42) and the game ended when the wicket-keeper was dismissed by Wally Wellham, the uncle of the future Test batsmen Dirk Wellham.

Fourth Test – Sydney

See Main Article – 1970–71 Ashes series

Northern New South Wales vs MCC

The MCC played a first class match against North New South Wales (they were scheduled to play the South later on the tour) which left them with two injuries. John Edrich was soon out on 7/1, but Brian Luckhurst (124) and Keith Fletcher (122) added 180 for the second wicket before Luckhurst was stumped. Fletcher retired hurt and was replaced by John Hampshire (41) and together they added 132 with Ray Illingworth (55 not out) before the captain declared on 355/4 when Hampshire was caught by Stanley Gilchrist, the father of Adam Gilchrist. Don Wilson took 7/62 as he dismissed North NSW for 171. Illingworth decided more batting practice was required and declined to enforce the follow on. Instead Edrich (38) and Luckhurst (45) added 83 for the first wicket, but Luckhurst retired hurt with badly bruised fingers. Colin Cowdrey (70) and John Hampshire (122) added 193 for the third wicket and the game ended when MCC reached 322/4.

Fifth Test – Melbourne

See Main Article – 1970–71 Ashes series

Sixth Test – Adelaide

See Main Article – 1970–71 Ashes series

Southern New South Wales vs MCC

The match was abandoned due to rain without a ball being bowled.

Western Australia vs MCC

Tony Lock's Western Australia won the Vehicle and General Knockout Cup and as a reward played the MCC in a One Day Match of 40 eight ball overs each at Sydney. Garth McKenzie broke Geoff Boycott's left forearm with the third ball of the match, he retired hurt and was incapacitated for the rest of the tour. The left arm fast-medium bowler Sam Gannon took 4/40 and Lock his best one day bowling of 3/20 as the MCC were restricted to 152 runs off 39.3 overs, only Basil d'Oliveira making any headway with 54. Western Australia managed less than 6 overs before the rain came down and ended the match, though Peter Lever managed to take 2/13.

New South Wales Country vs MCC

The MCC played one last upcountry game before the final Test and the end of the Australian part of their 1970–71 tour. The New South Wales Country team batted first and were dismissed for 116. Bob Willis had both the openers in the pavilion, caught by Alan Knott, for 27/2. Don Wilson (5/50) and Keith Fletcher (2/8) spun their way through the rest of the line up. Reserve wicket-keeper Bob Taylor showed his batting skills by opening the innings and making 72, adding 88 with Keith Fletcher (42). Once again the MCC batted on after they had won, this time losing an extra four wickets as they collapsed from 154/3 to 184/7.

Seventh Test – Sydney

See Main Article – 1970–71 Ashes series

Tour First Class Averages
source Due to his broken arm Geoff Boycott fell 18 runs short of matching Wally Hammond's record for the most runs on an MCC tour of Australia.

References

Annual reviews
 Playfair Cricket Annual 1971
 Wisden Cricketers' Almanack 1971

Further reading
 John Snow, Cricket Rebel: An Autobiography, Littlehampton Book Services Ltd, 1976
 E.W. Swanton, Swanton in Australia with MCC 1946–1975, Fontana, 1977
 Richard Whitington, Captains Outragreous? Cricket in the seventies, Stanley Paul, 1972
 Peter Arnold, The Illustrated Encyclopaedia of World of Cricket, W.H. Smith, 1985
 Geoffrey Boycott, Boycott: The Autobiography, Pan Books, 2006
 Ashley Brown, A Pictorial History of Cricket, Bison Books Ltd, 1988
 Greg Chappell, Old Hands Showed The Way, Test Series Official Book 1986–87, The Clashes for the Ashes, Australia vs England, Playbill Sport Publication, 1986
 Ian Chappell, Austin Robertson and Paul Rigby, Chappelli Has the Last Laugh, Lansdowne Press, 1980
 Colin Cowdrey, M. C. C. The Autobiography of a Cricketer, Coronet Books, 1977
 Basil d'Oliveira, Time to Declare: An Autobiography, Star, 1982
 Basil d'Oliveira, Basil d'Oliveira: Cricket and Controversy, Sphere, 2005
 Criss Freddi, The Guinness Book of Cricket Blunders, Guinness Publishing, 1996
 David Gower, Heroes and Contemporaries, Granada Publishing Ltd, 1985
 Tom Graveney and Norman Miller, The Ten Greatest Test Teams, Sidgewick and Jackson, 1988
 Ken Kelly and David Lemmon, Cricket Reflections: Five Decades of Cricket Photographs, Heinemann, 1985
 Brian Luckhurst and Mike Baldwin, Boot Boy to President, KOS Media, 2004
 Mark Peel, The Last Roman: A Biography of Colin Cowdrey, Andre Deutsch Ltd, 1999
 Ray Robinson, On Top Down Under, Cassell, 1975
 Mike Stevenson, Illy: A Biography Of Ray Illingworth, Midas Books, 1978
 E.W. Swanton(ed), The Barclays World of Cricket, Collins, 1986
 Derek Underwood, Beating the Bat: An Autobiography, S.Paul, 1975
 Bob Willis, Lasting the Pace, Collins, 1985

Videos and DVDs
 Allan Border and David Gower, The Best of the Ashes – 1970–1987, 2 Entertain Video, 1991
 David Steele, England Cricket Six of the Best: The Seventies, A Sharpe Focus Production for Green Umbrella, 2009 (shows England's 299 run victory in the 4th Test at Sydney)

External links
 CricketArchive tour itinerary

1970 in Australian cricket
1970 in English cricket
1970–71 Australian cricket season
1971 in Australian cricket
1971 in English cricket
English cricket tours of Australia
International cricket competitions from 1970–71 to 1975
Australia 1970–71